The Diesel Traction Group (DTG) is the Christchurch-based operator of a fleet of ex-New Zealand Railways Department diesel-electric locomotives. The fleet represents a full collection of New Zealand locomotive classes built by the English Electric Company and is a historically significant collection of early New Zealand diesel traction. All of the DTG's locomotives are owned by individual members through the sale of shareholdings.

History 
The DTG was formed in September 1983 to preserve one of the DG class locomotives that were being withdrawn from service at the time. DG 772 (TMS DG 2255) was purchased from NZR and moved to Ferrymead on 17 October 1983. During 1984, the DTG investigated purchasing a second DG, this time one of the ten that were fitted with a new cab during their last major overhaul in the early 1980s, but the proposal did not proceed.

In 1988, DG 772 was upgraded to mainline mechanical certification condition, repainted in its original colour scheme and used in the Ferrymead 125 celebrations, including a mainline excursion to Springfield. Further mainline charters to Dunedin, Clyde and Arthurs Pass followed.

The Group's second locomotive was Drewry TR 22 (TMS TR 91), one of the early designs of the TR class which entered service in 1939. It was offered for sale by tender and was delivered to Ferrymead in July 1985 without an engine or transmission. These vital items of equipment were purchased separately from NZR stores the following year and after installation into the locomotive, it was recommissioned into service a year after its arrival. TR 22 was then placed on lease to the Ferrymead Railway as a light shunter and was later sold to the railway's operators.

In November 1987, the Group's members purchased two DE class locomotives, DE's 511 and 512 (TMS DE 1412 and DE 1429), from Dunedin where they had been recently withdrawn from shunting duties. They were delivered to Ferrymead with other rolling stock the same month. DE 511 was repainted in the original colours and certified to mainline mechanical standard for participation in the Ferrymead 125 event the following year, which included shared operation of the Springfield excursion with DG 772. Following this, DE 511 is now undergoing repairs after being in storage. DE 1429 retained its latter-day TMS number and colours in preservation and had its engine overhauled in 1989–1990. It is currently on loan to the Weka Pass Railway.

In 1989, the DTG purchased DI class locomotive DI 1102 (TMS DI 1820), along with a number of spare parts and a complete diesel engine from class leader DI 1100 (TMS DI 1808), which was then being scrapped at Hutt Workshops. Following the completion of DG 772 in 2009, the DTG has turned their attention to restoring this locomotive to working order for use on the main line. It is now undergoing testing and certification for mainline running.

In 2009, the DTG was named as the custodians of FRONZ's English Electric DF class locomotive, DF 1501, after it was removed from its plinth in Auckland at the request of the site owners, scrap dealer Sims PMI. The locomotive was towed south in January 2009, and the DTG have stated their intention is to restore DF 1501 to working order at some time in the future. At present, the locomotive is receiving preventative maintenance and will be displayed in the National Railway Museum of New Zealand.

Location  
The DTG is based at Ferrymead Heritage Park, and their locomotives are used on passenger trains and heavy shunting services on the Ferrymead Railway. In the past, the group's locomotives have also ventured out onto other heritage/tourist railways and charters on the national rail network or visited other heritage railways. The DTG is a member of the Federation of Rail Organisations of New Zealand.

DTG Fleet

Locomotives

Wagons 
The DTG also possesses a small collection of five ex-NZR goods wagons, several of which are loaned by the Rail Heritage Trust.

See also
 Railway preservation in New Zealand

References

External links
 Diesel Traction Group

Rail transport in Christchurch
Organisations based in Christchurch